This is the order of battle of Allied and Japanese forces during the Admiralty Islands campaign of 1944.

Allied forces
The Allied Task Force BREWER for the occupation of the Admiralty Islands consisted of:

Ground Forces
All US Army unless otherwise noted
1st Cavalry Division (less 603rd Tank Company)
1st Cavalry Brigade
5th Cavalry Regiment
12th Cavalry Regiment
2nd Cavalry Brigade
7th Cavalry Regiment
8th Cavalry Regiment
1st Cavalry Division Artillery
61st Field Artillery Battalion
82nd Field Artillery Battalion
99th Field Artillery Battalion
8th Engineer Squadron
1st Medical Squadron
16th Quartermaster Squadron
1st Antitank Troop
1st Signal Troop
27th Ordnance Medium Maintenance Company
Alamo Scouts
2nd Battalion, 50th Coast Artillery Regiment
168th Anti-Aircraft Artillery Battalion (Gun)
HQ and HQ Battery, 15th Anti-Aircraft Artillery Group
Battery C, 237th Anti-Aircraft Artillery Battalion (Searchlight)
211th Coast Artillery Battalion (Anti-Aircraft) (Automatic Weapons)
Shore Battalion and Company A, Boat Battalion, 592nd Engineer Boat and Shore Regiment
1 Platoon, 453rd Engineer Depot Company
Detachment, 267th Ordnance Medium Maintenance Company (Anti-Aircraft)
287th Ordnance Medium Maintenance Company
27th Portable Surgical Hospital 
30th Portable Surgical Hospital
603rd Medical Clearing Company
58th Evacuation Hospital
28th Malaria Survey Unit
52nd Malaria Control Unit
3526th Quartermaster Truck Company (less 2 platoons)
695th Quartermaster Truck Company
2nd Platoon, 1998th Quartermaster Truck Company
1 Platoon, 3818th Gas Supply Company
Detachment, 493rd Quartermaster Depot Supply Company
Company C, 267th Quartermaster Service Battalion (less 1 platoon)
HQ and 2nd Platoon, 123rd Quartermaster Bakery Company
Provisional Bakery Platoon (2nd Platoon, 352nd Quartermaster Bakery Company)
1 Section, 286th Quartermaster Refrigeration Company
294th Port Company
167th Port Company (less 1 Platoon and 1 Section)
466th Amphibious Truck Company (less 1 platoon)
Detachment, 94th Chemical Composite Company
Section, 1st Platoon, 604th Quartermaster Graves Registration Company
Detachment, Company A, 60th Signal Battalion
611th Ordnance Ammunition Company
17th and 19th Radio Station Sections, 832nd Signal Service Company
ANGAU Detachment

Naval Forces
All USN unless otherwise noted
Naval Shore Detachment, 7th Fleet
No. 9 Naval Advance Unit (less Advance Detachment)
17th Naval Construction Regiment
No. 40 Communications Unit
Hydrographic Survey Unit
Advance Echelon LION 4
6 Construction Battalions
3 ACORNs (less CBs)
1 Construction Battalion (Special)
No. 15 PT Overhaul and Operating Base

Air Forces
All RAAF unless otherwise noted
No. 73 Wing
No. 76 Squadron (P-40 Kittyhawk)
No. 77 Squadron (P-40 Kittyhawk)
No. 79 Squadron (Supermarine Spitfire)
No. 114 Mobile Fighter Sector HQ
No. 152, 340, 345, 346 and 347 Radar Stations
No. 73 Wing Signals Station
No. 49 Operational Base Unit
No. 12 Repair and Salvage Unit
No 3 section, 1 Malaria Control Unit
No. 77 Medical Clearing Station
12th Air Liaison Party (USAAF)
Detachment 7, Transportation and Movements Office
Detachment 4, Replenishing Centre
Detachment, 16 Store Unit
Detachment, 7 Coastal Unit
Canteen Unit

Japanese forces
The Japanese garrison of the Admiralty Islands was expanded in the months prior to the Allied landings. On 2 February 1944 it consisted of:
1st Battalion, 229th Infantry Regiment
2nd Battalion, 1st Independent Mixed Regiment
51st Transport Regiment
Elements, 14th Naval Base Force

Notes

Operation Cartwheel
World War II orders of battle